The SIAI S.17 was an Italian racing flying boat built by SIAI for the 1920 Schneider Trophy race.

Design and development
Although earlier SIAI aircraft had been employed as racers, the single-seat S.17 was SIAIs first specialized racing aircraft designed as such.

Operational history
The S.17 participated in the 1920 Schneider Trophy races at Monaco, but crashed during the final take-off and did not finish.

Operators

Specifications

See also

References

S.17
1920s Italian sport aircraft
Flying boats
Schneider Trophy
Biplanes
Single-engined pusher aircraft
Aircraft first flown in 1920